The title of university professor is an honor bestowed upon a very small number of its tenured faculty members at the National University of Singapore (NUS) who rendered outstanding leadership and service to NUS and the wider community. The university professor title was first handed out in 2000. Presently, there are only five university professors in NUS.

Present National University of Singapore university professors 
 Chong Chi Tat, renowned mathematician in recursion/computability theory; deputy vice chancellor, deputy president and provost of the National University of Singapore from 1996 to 2004.
 Lim Pin, longest-serving vice chancellor

 Shih Choon Fong, renowned fracture mechanics expert; former president of the National University of Singapore and the King Abdullah University of Science and Technology
 Tan Chorh Chuan, former president of the National University of Singapore from 2008 to 2017.
 Wang Gungwu, eminent historian of China and Southeast Asia; chairman of the East Asian Institute and chairman of the managing board of the Lee Kuan Yew School of Public Policy, National University of Singapore; former vice chancellor of the University of Hong Kong.

References

People associated with the National University of Singapore